Tanvir Naqvi (born Syed Khursheed Ali; 16 February 1919  1 November 1972), also spelled Tanveer Naqvi, was a Pakistani lyricist and poet. He wrote lyrics for 200 uncertain films, including Lollywood and Bollywood. He made his debut in Indian cinema with Swami film directed by Abdul Rashid Kardar, and later remained active in Pakistani film industry for over fifteen years. He earned recognition after writing "Aawaz De Kaha Hai" song for Anmol Ghadi film and "Rang Laayega Shaheedon ka Lahoo" song covering 1965 India-Pakistan war.

He was born in Lahore, British India (in modern-day Lahore, Pakistan). He originally belonged to a family of Persian writers from Iran, and married  Noor Jehan's sister, Eidan Bai.

Career 
As a lyricist, he started his career around 1946 at early age, but after moving to Pakistan, he wrote lyrics for Urdu and Punjabi language films, including Pakistan's first feature film Teri Yaad. He also wrote for Salma (1960), Noor's first film as a playback singer. In 1933, he went to Bombay when a film director Abdur Rashid Kardar invited him there. Prior to his debut in films, he was writing gazals, but later used to wrote songs for Hindi, Urdu and Punjabi films. He is also credited for writing lyrics for Pakistan's patriotic song titled "Rang Laye Ga Shaheedon Ka Lahoo", sung by Noor Jehan. He wrote this song from one of his poems. During his career, he wrote two prominent naats such as "Shah-e-Madina Yasrab Ke Wali" and "Jo Na Hota Tera Jamal Hi". Before the split of Indian subcontinent, Naqvi was recognized one of the greatest classical writers in Punjabi poetry and literature between 1950s and 1970s.

After partition, the Pakistan film industry didn't produce many films, and by the end of 1952, it had made only five films. Later, Khwaja Khurshid Anwar, a Pakistani filmmaker and a music director teamed up with several other people, including Tanvir Naqvi as songwriter. The team succeeded in making some films between 1956 and 1959, focused on psychological issues experienced by actors due to multiple cultural conflicts.

Filmography

Death 
He died on 1 November 1972 in Lahore, Pakistan.

References

External links 
 
 Tanvir Naqvi on Rekhta Foundation

1919 births
1972 deaths
Poets from Lahore
Punjabi-language lyricists
Urdu-language lyricists
Nigar Award winners
Pakistani songwriters